Greenwich Hospital was a permanent home for retired sailors of the Royal Navy, which operated from 1692 to 1869. Its buildings, in Greenwich, London, were later used by the Royal Naval College, Greenwich and the University of Greenwich, and are now known as the Old Royal Naval College. The word "hospital" was used in its original sense of a place providing hospitality for those in need of it, and did not refer to medical care, although the buildings included an infirmary which, after Greenwich Hospital closed, operated as Dreadnought Seaman's Hospital until 1986.

The foundation which operated the hospital still exists, for the benefit of former Royal Navy personnel and their dependants. It now provides sheltered housing on other sites.

History
The hospital was created as the Royal Hospital for Seamen at Greenwich on the instructions of Queen Mary II, who had been inspired by the sight of wounded sailors returning from the Battle of La Hogue in 1692.  She ordered the King Charles wing of the palace—originally designed by architect John Webb for King Charles II in 1664—to be remodelled as a naval hospital to provide a counterpart for the Chelsea Hospital for soldiers.  Sir Christopher Wren and his assistant Nicholas Hawksmoor gave their services free of charge as architects of the new Royal Hospital. Sir John Vanbrugh succeeded Wren as architect, completing the complex to Wren's original plans.

An early controversy arose when it emerged that the original plans for the hospital would have blocked the riverside view from the Queen's House.  Queen Mary II therefore ordered that the buildings be split, providing an avenue leading from the river through the hospital grounds up to the Queen's House and Greenwich Hill beyond.  This gave the hospital its distinctive look, with its buildings arranged in a number of quadrants. Its four main buildings (the "Courts") are bisected north–south by a Grand Square and processional route, and east–west by an internal road from the East Gate (and gate-house) to the West Gate (and gate-house) by Greenwich Market in Greenwich town centre. The Grand Square and processional route running north–south maintained access to, and a river view from, the Queen's House and Greenwich Park beyond.

Construction was financed through an endowment, financed through the transfer of £19,500 in fines paid by merchants convicted of smuggling in 1695, a public fundraising appeal which brought in £9,000, and a £2,000 annual contribution from Treasury. Parliament passed the Greenwich Hospital, etc. Act 1695 (7 & 8 Will. 3 c. 21), long titled An Act for the Increase and Encouragement of Seamen, which established the basic rules of use and benefits for seamen, and amended it the following year by the Greenwich Hospital, etc. Act 1696. In 1705 an additional £6,472 was paid into the fund, comprising the liquidated value of estates belonging to the recently hanged pirate Captain William Kidd.

The first of the principal buildings constructed was the King Charles Court (the oldest part dating back to the restoration), completed in March 1705.

The other principal buildings constructed included Queen Mary Court (planned by Wren and Hawksmoor, but not built until after Wren's death, by Thomas Ripley), completed in 1742, Queen Anne Court (architects: Wren and Hawksmoor), and King William Court (designed by Wren, but completed by Hawksmoor and Sir John Vanbrugh).

Queen Mary Court houses the hospital's chapel (designed by Wren but not completed until 1742). Its present appearance dates from 1779 to 1789, when it was rebuilt to a design by James "Athenian" Stuart after a devastating fire. The ornate plasterwork was created by John Papworth. King William Court is famous for its baroque Painted Hall, which was painted by Sir James Thornhill in honour of King William III and Queen Mary II (the ceiling of the Lower Hall), of Queen Anne and her husband, Prince George of Denmark (the ceiling of the Upper Hall) and George I (the north wall of the Upper Hall). The Painted Hall was deemed too magnificent for the pensioned seamen's refectory and was never regularly used as such. It became a tourist destination, opened for viewing. On 5 January 1806, Lord Nelson's body lay in state in the Painted Hall of the Greenwich Hospital before being taken up the river Thames to St Paul's Cathedral for a state funeral. Nelson's Pediment in the William Courtyard was sculpted in Coade stone in 1813 as a public memorial, and was regarded by the Coade workers as the finest of all their work. In 1824 a National Gallery of Naval Art was created in the Painted Hall, where it remained until 1936, when the collection was transferred to the National Maritime Museum, newly established in the Queen's House and adjacent buildings.

On the riverside front of the north-east corner of King Charles Court is an obelisk, designed by Philip Hardwick and unveiled in 1855, erected in memory of the Arctic explorer Joseph René Bellot, who died in an unsuccessful attempt to rescue the members of John Franklin's ill-fated expedition to open a Northwest Passage in northern Canada.

The first governor, Sir William Gifford, took up office in 1708. In 1774, the then Lieutenant Governor, Captain Thomas Baillie made allegations of mismanagement of the hospital's affairs, which led to a celebrated court case.

A Royal Hospital School opened on the site in 1712 to provide assistance and education to the orphans of seafarers in the Royal and Merchant Navies. In 1933 it moved to Holbrook, Suffolk (where it remains today); the old school buildings were reopened the following year as the National Maritime Museum.

The Greenwich Hospital buildings included an infirmary, constructed in the 1760s to a design also by James Stuart, where pensioners were attended by trained medical staff (Sir John Liddell was for a time senior medical officer). After some adaptation and rebuilding this became the Dreadnought Seamen's Hospital in 1870 (taking its name from a hospital ship moored off Greenwich). The treatment for tropical diseases moved in 1919 to the Seamen's Hospital Society hospital near Euston Square, in central London, to form the Hospital for Tropical Diseases. The Dreadnought Seaman's Hospital closed in 1986, with special services for seamen and their families then provided by the Dreadnought Unit at St Thomas's Hospital in Lambeth.

Greenwich Hospital closed in 1869, with the buildings being taken over by the Royal Naval College, Greenwich in 1873.

Due to railway construction, the remains of thousands of sailors and officers, including many of those who had fought in the Battle of Trafalgar, were removed from the hospital site in 1875 and reinterred in East Greenwich Pleasaunce also called Pleasaunce Park (named after the former Palace of Placentia which had been on the site of the hospital).

Governors

Governors included:
 Vice-Admiral Thomas Hopsonn (1704–1708)
 Captain Sir William Gifford (1708–1714)
 Vice-Admiral Lord Aylmer (1714–1720)
 Admiral Sir John Jennings (1720–1743)
 Admiral Sir John Balchen (1743–1744)
 Captain Lord Archibald Hamilton (1746–1754)
 Admiral Isaac Townsend (1754–1765)
 Admiral Sir George Rodney (1765–1770)
 Admiral Sir Francis Holburne (1771)
 Admiral Sir Charles Hardy (1771–1780)
 Admiral Sir Hugh Palliser (1780–1796)
 Admiral Viscount Hood (1796–1816)
 Admiral Sir John Colpoys (1816–1821)
 Admiral Sir Richard Keats (1821–1834)
 Vice-Admiral Sir Thomas Hardy (1834–1839)
 Admiral Sir Robert Stopford (1841–1847)
 Admiral Sir Charles Adam (1847–1853)
 Admiral Sir James Gordon (1853–1869)
 Admiral Sir Houston Stewart (1869–1872)
 Admiral Sir Sydney Dacres (1872–1884)
 Admiral Sir Lewis Jones (1884–1895)

Greenwich Hospital: the charity
The charitable foundation of Greenwich Hospital still exists, although it is no longer based at the original site. It is now a Crown Charity for the benefit of seafarers and their dependants, with the Secretary of State for Defence acting as The Crown's sole trustee. The charity now funds sheltered housing for former Royal Navy personnel and the school it spawned, the Royal Hospital School, now at Holbrook in Suffolk. The charity's head office is located in the City of London.

The charity derives some of its funds from properties in and around the hospital site. The core hospital buildings are let on a 150-year lease to the University of Greenwich and Trinity Laban College of Music. Greenwich Promenade is let to the Port of London Authority, while retail and residential properties in central Greenwich, including Greenwich Market, form the charity's core investment portfolio.

In August 2020, several market traders warned they might have to cease trading after Greenwich Hospital's managing agent Knight Frank informed them of steep rent increases during the COVID-19 pandemic. After complaints, it was reported in September 2020 that the rent hikes would be reversed.

See also 
 Healthcare in London
 List of hospitals in England

References

Further reading

External links

Greenwich Hospital charity
Greenwich in-pensioners website
Design drawings in evolution

1692 establishments in England
1869 disestablishments in England
Organizations established in 1692
Hospitals established in the 17th century
Hospitals disestablished in 1869
Admiralty departments
Defunct hospitals in London
Health in the Royal Borough of Greenwich
Military hospitals in the United Kingdom
Veterans' homes
Mary II of England
Christopher Wren buildings in London